{{safesubst:#invoke:RfD||2=A Grade|month = March
|day =  8
|year = 2023
|time = 20:29
|timestamp = 20230308202939

|content=
REDIRECT Grading in education

}}